Subcancilla candida is a species of sea snail, a marine gastropod mollusc in the family Mitridae, the miters or miter snails.

Description
The length of the shell varies between 10 mm and 30 mm.

Distribution
This marine species occurs off Puerto Rico, the Virgin Islands, Venezuela and Panama

References

 Cernohorsky W. O. (1991). The Mitridae of the world (Part 2). Monographs of Marine Mollusca 4.

External links
 

Mitridae
Gastropods described in 1845